Barkha Singh is an Indian actress who mainly works in Hindi films and web shows. She began her career as a child artist and worked in films such as Mujhse Dosti Karoge! (2002) and Samay: When Time Strikes (2003). She then worked in television shows including Bhagyalaxmi (2015) and Girls on Top (2016).

Singh is best known for her portrayal in the web shows, Engineering Girls and Please Find Attached and the films, 36 Farmhouse and Maja Ma both (2022).

Career 
Barkha Singh started her career as a child artist. She played the younger Kareena Kapoor as Tina in Mujhse Dosti Karoge. Barkha Singh is well known for her role as Gia Sen in the show Girls on Top broadcast on MTV India. She also played her cameo role in the serial MTV Fanaah as Vedika. Barkha is known for her character in the serial Yeh Hai Aashiqui and Love by Chance, as well as her role of Surbhi Varun Shukla in the soap opera Bhagyalaxmi on &TV.

She started her own YouTube page in January 2018, posting several travel and fashion blogs. She has gained fame from doing several popular web shows like Please Find Attached, Work Life Balance, Engineering Girls, Murder Meri Jaan, Netflix's Masaba Masaba(S2). Her recently released web series was The Great Wedding of Munnes opposite Abhishek Banerjee. In 2021 she was seen in the movie Silence... Can You Hear It? starring Manoj Bajpayee and in 2022 she was seen leading in two movies, 36 Farmhouse and Maja Maa.

In the media 
Singh has been associated with brands such as Amazon, Cadbury, Coca-Cola and Clinic Plus. She has appeared in multiple television commercials and is an animal activist. Apart from acting, she has hosted online game shows.

Filmography

Films

Television

Web series

Awards and nominations

References

External links 

Living people
Indian television actresses
1992 births
Actresses in Hindi television
21st-century Indian actresses
Fashion YouTubers